Alex Clark (born 17 April 1987) is a Scottish squash player. She represented Scotland at the 2014 Commonwealth Games held in her home nation, Scotland and competed in the women’s doubles. She graduated at the University of Birmingham. Currently, she is coaching the sport of squash in the Cynwyd Club.

References 

1987 births
Living people
Scottish female squash players
Squash players at the 2014 Commonwealth Games
Commonwealth Games competitors for Scotland
Sportspeople from Portsmouth
Scottish people of English descent